Chelsea and Westminster Hospital is a 430-bed teaching hospital located in Chelsea, London. The hospital has a rich history in that it serves as the new site for the Westminster Hospital. It is operated by Chelsea and Westminster Hospital NHS Foundation Trust, and became a member of Imperial College Academic Health Science Centre (Imperial AHSC) in July 2020. The hospital is the central part of Imperial College London Chelsea and Westminster Campus, and plays an integral role in teaching students and medical research at Imperial College London.

History
The first hospital on the site was conceived in 1876 and officially opened as the St George's Union Infirmary in February 1878. This facility became St Stephen's Hospital in 1925 and, after it had joined the National Health Service in 1948, continued in service until it closed in 1989. Part of the old hospital survives as an HIV unit known as "St Stephen's Centre".

The Chelsea and Westminster Hospital, which was designed by the architects Sheppard Robson, was built on the St Stephen's Hospital site and was officially opened by the Queen in May 1993. It brought together staff, services and equipment from five other hospitals in London:
 St Stephen's Hospital (1876–1989), the original hospital on the site
 St Mary Abbots Hospital (1871–1992), in Marloes Road
 West London Hospital (1856–1993), in Hammersmith Road, known for its maternity services in the 1970s
 Westminster Hospital (1719–1992), in Horseferry Road, and its medical school in Page Street.
 Westminster Children's Hospital (1903–1995), on Vincent Square
 
The hospital displays many treasures from the predecessor hospitals. Some of these are in the first floor hospital chapel, including a 16th-century painting by Veronese from the Westminster Hospital and stained glass windows from St Mary Abbots Hospital and the Westminster Children's Hospital.

Services
Chelsea and Westminster maintains a range of medical and surgical acute services:

Hand trauma
The hospital provides a number of services which include a specialist hand surgery/management unit sometimes known as HMU.

HIV / GUM
The hospital's HIV/GUM Clinical Directorate was established in April 1991, and is today the largest specialist HIV unit in Europe, and enjoys a worldwide reputation as a centre of excellence in both the care of HIV-positive patients and a wide range of associated clinical research.
 
The St Stephen's Centre is also home to the core laboratory of the International AIDS Vaccine Initiative (IAVI).

Radio Chelsea and Westminster 
 
Radio Chelsea and Westminster is the hospital's own hospital radio station, available for; patients, staff and the local community. It was launched in 1977 to provide music and escapism for patients. Patients are able to listen to the hospital radio on Channel 6 on their hospedia bedside unit, or online at www.radiocw.org. The radio station has featured in a number of locations around the hospital it is currently on the second floor of the hospital between lift banks C and D. GB News presenter Nana Akua used to work for the station.

Education
In 1984, Westminster Hospital Medical School merged with the Charing Cross Hospital Medical School to form Charing Cross and Westminster Medical School. This was part of a series of mergers of London medical schools in the early 1980s, foreshadowing a larger series in the late 1990s, which brought all the institutes together into five large schools. In 1997, as part of the second wave, CXWMS merged with Imperial College, London (and its medical department, St Mary's Hospital Medical School), the National Heart and Lung Institute, and the Royal Postgraduate Medical School, to form Imperial College School of Medicine. Chelsea and Westminster Hospital maintains strong ties with Imperial College School of Medicine and is a teaching hospital for students undergoing clinical attachments in various specialties.

Notable births
Notable births include:

 Dakota Blue Richards, English actress
 Sienna Elizabeth Mapelli Mozzi (born 2021), daughter of Princess Beatrice of York and Edoardo Mapelli Mozzi

See also
 List of hospitals in England

References

External links
 Chelsea and Westminster Hospital
 Chelsea and Westminster Health Charity – owner and curator of the visual art, installation art and sculpture displayed at Chelsea and Westminster Hospital
 NHS Care Records Service
 Cranio-Orbito-Palpebral service, Chelsea and Westminster Hospital
 International AIDS Vaccine Initiative (IAVI)
 St Stephen's AIDS Trust Clinical Trials Unit
 You Choose – Chelsea and Westminster HIV information site for gay men

 

1993 establishments in England
1993 in London
Buildings and structures in the Royal Borough of Kensington and Chelsea
Chelsea, London
Hospital buildings completed in 1993
Hospitals established in 1993
NHS hospitals in London
Teaching hospitals in London